Coombe Pedal Systems are high performance clipless bicycle pedals, manufactured by W Coombe Engineering Ltd in Boulder, Colorado, USA.

The original "Coombe Pro" pedal system, released in 1999, featured a unique, twist-in to engage, retention mechanism, and a compact, triple row bearing design, both of which were patented by William Coombe in Boulder, Colorado in May 2001, under US Patents #6234046 and #6227071.

Though hailed by many cyclists to be the "best pedal" made, due to the high quality, low profile and lightweight design, this model was discontinued in 2006 after most road cycling shoes had changed exclusively to the 3 bolt cleat mounting pattern, which the cleats were not directly compatible with. 

Subsequently, the "Millennium II" pedal system was introduced, being almost identical in design and function to the original "Pro" pedals. However, it features a wider pedal platform, and a cleat designed to be mounted directly to cycling shoes with the standard 3 bolt mounting pattern.

Years later, in early 2018, Coombe introduced the "Millennium Pro" pedal system. This latest model incorporates a compact, triple row bearing design (very similar to its predecessors), but features a new, patent pending, retention mechanism which the company states provides unrivaled performance and safety.

References

External links
 Official website

Bicycle parts